Jerome "Jerry" Jaxon is a fictional character appearing in American comic books published by Marvel Comics.

Publication history
Jerome Jaxon first appeared in Alpha Flight #2-3 (September–October 1983), and was created by John Byrne.

The character subsequently appears in Alpha Flight #6-7 (January–February 1984), and #10-13 (May–August 1984), in which he died. The character appeared posthumously in Alpha Flight: In the Beginning #-1 (July 1997).

Jerome Jaxon appeared as part of the "Omega Flight" entry in the Official Handbook of the Marvel Universe Deluxe Edition #9.

Fictional character biography
Jerome Jaxon was born in Red Deer, Alberta, Canada. He was an executive vice president in charge of research and development at Am-Can Petroleum Company. One of his subordinates at Am-Can, James Hudson, had developed a powered exoskeleton designed for excavation, which Jaxon sought to weaponize for military purposes. Hudson refused, and with the support of Jaxon's secretary Heather MacNeil, Hudson destroyed the plans, stole and abandoned the prototype, and kept the cybernetic control helmet. At Heather's urging, Hudson sought protection from the Canadian government; with the assistance of the Prime Minister, Hudson was exonerated of any wrongdoing, and inspired by the emergence of American superheroes such as the Fantastic Four, Hudson was given authority to create a Canadian superhero team under the direction of Department H. Hudson revamped his exosuit into a form-fitting battlesuit which he eventually donned as leader of Alpha Flight, under the codenames Weapon Alpha, Vindicator, and, finally, Guardian.

The failure to deliver a weapons system based on Hudson's designs proved devastating to Jaxon's career. After being dismissed from Am-Can, his wife took their two children and left him. Destitute, and with no prospects for the future, Jaxon attempted to commit suicide by hanging himself, only to be discovered by his landlady. Although Jaxon lived, the brain damage suffered from asphyxiation left him permanently unable to walk.

After learning about Alpha Flight, and realizing that Guardian had to be James Hudson, Jaxon sought out Roxxon Oil, the parent company of the now-dissolved Am-Can. Roxxon executives proved receptive to Jaxon's ideas, and granted him a position as executive vice president. Paired with Delphine Courtney, a servitor robot disguised as a human woman, Jaxon set about plotting his revenge against Hudson by having Courtney recruit several superhuman castoffs from the discontinued Department H program: Diamond Lil, Wild Child, Flashback, Smart Alec, and Roger Bochs, creator of the Box robot. Diamond Lil, Smart Alec, and Wild Child had been part of Gamma Flight, and Flashback and Box part of Beta Flight. While the others were willing to go along with Jaxon's revenge plan, Bochs had no ill will toward Hudson, and chose to infiltrate the group, which Jaxon dubbed Omega Flight.

As Alpha Flight had been disbanded, James Hudson had been looking for steady work, and Jaxon sent Courtney to offer him a job at Roxxon's New York City office. With support from his wife Heather, Hudson accepted, and they moved in. However, Courtney lured Heather into a trap, where Jaxon revealed to her his plan for revenge; due to Heather's role in Jaxon's downfall, she was to be killed, but only after Guardian had been destroyed.

When Guardian learned of the nature of Heather's kidnapping, he flew into Jaxon's trap at the World Trade Center, and faced off against Omega Flight. Alpha Flight soon arrived on the scene, having been teleported to New York by Shaman. During the battle between the two Flights, Box removed Guardian from the main fight into another part of the building. It was there that Jaxon revealed that he had taken control of the Box robot from Roger Bochs, as he wanted to kill Guardian personally. Although he brutally beat Guardian, badly damaging his battlesuit, Hudson was able to use his own suit to overload the Box robot; the feedback to the control helmet killed Jaxon.

Although relieved that Bochs had not betrayed him, Hudson had little time to celebrate his victory, as his suit was about to explode. Heather, who'd gotten away from Courtney after discovering the robot's true nature, entered the room just as the suit was overloading, and as it exploded, Hudson appeared to be burned to ashes in front of Heather's eyes. Jaxon had seemingly achieved a pyrrhic victory, although it was later revealed that Guardian had managed to channel the overload into an extension of the gravity-cancelling ability of his suit that sent him on a trip through time and space; Heather would go on to lead Alpha Flight as Vindicator), and eventually be reunited with her husband.

References

External links
 AlphaFlight.Net Alphanex Entry on - Jerome Jaxon

Characters created by John Byrne (comics)
Comics characters introduced in 1983
Fictional characters from Alberta
Marvel Comics supervillains